Valdresflye, also spelled Valdresflya and Valdresflyi, is a mountain plateau in the easternmost part of the Jotunheimen mountains in Norway. The plateau lies in Innlandet county, mostly in Øystre Slidre Municipality, but a small area extends into Vang Municipality as well.

The plateau is surrounded by several mountains including Gråhøi to the east, Heimdalshøe to the northeast, Tjønnholstinden to the northwest, and Rasletinden to the west. The lakes Bygdin and Vinstre lie along the south side of the plateau.

Name
The plateaus is named Valdresflye. The first element is the name of the district Valdres in which it is located. The last element is the finite form of fly which means 'flat mountain plateau'.

Media gallery

See also
List of mountains of Norway

References

Øystre Slidre
Landforms of Innlandet
Plateaus of Norway